The Wandering Jew is a character from Christian legend.

Wandering Jew can also refer to:

Arts and entertainment
 The Wandering Jew (Sue novel), an 1844 novel by Eugène Sue
 Le Juif errant (opera), an 1852 opera by Fromental Halévy, loosely inspired by Sue's novel
 The Wandering Jew (Heym novel), 1981
 The Wandering Jew (1923 film), British silent fantasy film
 The Wandering Jew (1933 film), British fantasy drama film
 "The Wandering Jew" (ballad), a 17th-century English "broadside Ballad"

Plants

Tradescantia
Several trailing species of Tradescantia, also called spiderworts, inchplants, and wandering dudes:
 Tradescantia fluminensis, green leaves with white flowers
 Tradescantia pallida, purple leaves, with white, pink or purple flowers
 Tradescantia zebrina, leaves with a zebra-stripe pattern of white and green, with dark purple undersides

Commelina
Four species of dayflower:
 Commelina africana, or yellow wandering jew
 Commelina benghalensis, native to tropical Asia and Africa
 Commelina cyanea, native to Australia
 Commelina ensifolia, native to Australia

Other plants 
 Saxifraga stolonifera, native to Asia
 Tinantia pringlei, the Mexican or spotted wandering jew

See also
 The Eternal Jew (disambiguation)
 The Eternal Jew (1940 film), a Nazi propaganda film
 The International Jew, 1920s anti-Semitic writings authored by Henry Ford